Romano Christian Schmid (born 27 January 2000) is an Austrian professional footballer who plays as an attacking midfielder for Bundesliga club Werder Bremen and the Austria national team.

Career
While under contract with Red Bull Salzburg Schmid played for its feeder club FC Liefering.

In January 2019, Schmid joined Bundesliga side Werder Bremen. One month later, on 5 February 2019, he was loaned out to Wolfsberger AC for the rest of the season. In April 2022, he agreed a contract extension with Werder Bremen.

Career statistics

Club

International

References

External links

2000 births
Living people
Footballers from Graz
Austrian footballers
Association football midfielders
SK Sturm Graz players
FC Liefering players
SV Werder Bremen players
Wolfsberger AC players
Bundesliga players
2. Bundesliga players
Austrian Football Bundesliga players
Austria youth international footballers
Austria under-21 international footballers
Austria international footballers
Austrian expatriate footballers
Austrian expatriate sportspeople in Germany
Expatriate footballers in Germany